Georgia's 8th congressional district is a congressional district in the U.S. state of Georgia. The district is currently represented by Republican Austin Scott.

The district is located in central and south-central Georgia, and stretches from the geographical center of the state to the Florida border.  The district includes the cities of Cordele, Tifton, Moultrie, Valdosta, and portions of Macon.

Recent results in presidential elections

Counties
 Atkinson 
 Baldwin
 Ben Hill
 Berrien
 Bibb (Partial, see also )
 Bleckley
 Brooks
 Clinch
 Colquitt
 Cook
 Crisp
 Dodge
 Echols
 Houston (Partial, see also )
 Irwin
 Jeff Davis
 Jones
 Lanier
 Lowndes
 Monroe
 Pulaski
 Telfair
 Thomas
 Tift
 Turner
 Twiggs
 Wilcox
 Wilkinson
 Worth

List of members representing the district

Election results

2002

2004

2006

A Republican mid-decade redistricting made this Macon-based district more compact and somewhat more Republican. Incumbent Marshall faced a very tough challenge by former U.S. Representative Mac Collins, who represented an adjoining district from 1993 to 2005. Less than 60 percent of the population in Marshall's present 3rd District was retained in the new 8th District. The reconfigured 8th includes Butts County, which was the political base of Collins, who once served as chair of the county commission. On the other hand, the 8th also includes all of the city of Macon where Marshall served as mayor from 1995 until 1999. The race featured heavy spending, not only by the candidates themselves but also from independent groups. During the campaign, President George W. Bush attended a rally on Collins' behalf.

2008

2010

2012

2014

2016

2018

2020

2022

See also

Georgia's congressional districts
List of United States congressional districts

References

 Congressional Biographical Directory of the United States 1774–present

External links
 PDF map of Georgia's 8th district at nationalatlas.gov
 Georgia's 8th district at GovTrack.us

08